Nicolas Inversi, O.S.M. of Nicolò degl'Inversi (died 1471) was a Roman Catholic prelate who served as Bishop of Chioggia (1463–1471).

Biography
Nicolas Inversi was ordained a priest in the Order of Friar Servants of Mary.
On 8 February 1463, he was appointed during the papacy of Pope Pius II as Bishop of Chioggia.
On 15 May 1463, he was consecrated bishop by Andrea Bondimerio, Patriarch of Venice.
He served as Bishop of Chioggia until his death in 1471.

References

External links and additional sources
 (for Chronology of Bishops) 
 (for Chronology of Bishops) 

15th-century Roman Catholic bishops in the Republic of Venice
Bishops appointed by Pope Pius II
1471 deaths
Servite bishops
Servites